The 2014 Rallye de France — Alsace was the eleventh round of the 2014 World Rally Championship season. The event was based in Strasbourg, France, and started on 3 October and finished on 5 October after eighteen special stages, totaling 303.6 competitive kilometres.

Finnish driver Jari-Matti Latvala won the rally for the first time and in doing so became the first non-French driver to win the Strasbourg-based rally since its inception in 2010. It was Latvala's fourth and final victory of the 2014 season. There were no classified WRC-3 competitors as all those who finished were excluded for homologation irregularities. However, they were counted for in the JWRC category.

Entry list

Results

Event standings

Special stages

Power Stage
The "Power stage" was a  stage at the end of the rally.

Standings after the rally

WRC

Drivers' Championship standings

Manufacturers' Championship standings

Other

WRC2 Drivers' Championship standings

WRC3 Drivers' Championship standings

Junior WRC Drivers' Championship standings

References

Results – juwra.com/World Rally Archive
Results – ewrc-results.com

France
Rallye de France-Alsace
Rallye de France Alsace